Michael Wilkinson is a costume designer known for his work with Zack Snyder and the DCEU. Wilkinson was nominated for an Academy Award for Best Costume Design for the 2013 film American Hustle.

Selected filmography 
 Star Wars: Andor (2022)
 Zack Snyder's Justice League (2021)
 Jingle Jangle: A Christmas Journey (2020)
 The Gentlemen (2019)
 Seberg (2019)
 Aladdin (2019)
 Justice League (2017)
 The Current War (2017)
 Batman v Superman: Dawn of Justice (2016)
 Joy (2015)
 Noah (2014)
 American Hustle (2013)
 Man of Steel (2013)
 The Twilight Saga: Breaking Dawn – Part 2 (2012)
 The Twilight Saga: Breaking Dawn - Part 1 (2011)
 Sucker Punch (2011)
 Tron: Legacy (2010)
 Jonah Hex (2010)
 Terminator Salvation (2009)
 Watchmen (2009)
 Rendition (2007)
 The Nanny Diaries (2007)
 300 (2006)
 Babel (2006)
 Friends with Money (2006)
 Sky High (2005)
 Dark Water (2005)
 Imaginary Heroes (2004)
 Garden State (2004)
 Just Another Story (2003)
 Life on the Line (TV Movie) (2003)
 Milwaukee, Minnesota (2003)
 American Splendor (2003)
 Party Monster (2003)
 When Strangers Appear (2001)
 Looking for Alibrandi (2000)
 True Love and Chaos'' (1997)

References

External links

Australian costume designers
Living people
1970 births